Bostancı is an underground station on the M4 line of the Istanbul Metro. Located under beneath the Bostancı Interchange in the Bostancı neighborhood of Kadıköy, Istanbul, it was opened on 17 August 2012. Bostancı is the largest metro station on the M4, consisting of three tracks and two platforms. Connections to IETT bus service is available on both levels of the interchange.

The mezzanine level of the station has a total of five exits to each side of the Bostancı interchange.

Station Layout

References

External links
Bostancı station central portal in Google Street View

Railway stations opened in 2012
Istanbul metro stations
Transport in Kadıköy
2012 establishments in Turkey